Davide Di Molfetta (born 23 June 1996) is an Italian footballer who plays as a forward for Feralpisalò.

Club career

Early career 
Di Molfetta was born in Sesto San Giovanni, a suburb of Milan. He first started playing football as a child, joining local amateur club Rondinella. At the age of 6 he was recruited by A.C. Milan, where he went on to spend 13 years in their youth system. Di Molfetta also made his professional debut with the club, coming on for Giacomo Bonaventura in the late stages of a 3–1 away win against Atalanta on 30 May 2015, aged 18.

Benevento and Rimini (2015–2016) 
For the 2015–16 season, Di Molfetta was sent out on loan to Lega Pro club Benevento. However, the deal was cut short during the January transfer window and he was loaned out to Rimini, another Lega Pro club, for the remainder of the season.

Prato (2016–2017) 
At the beginning of the 2016–17 season, Di Molfetta was once again loaned out to a Lega Pro club, this time to Prato.

Serie C 
On 28 August 2019, he joined Catania.

On 8 October 2020, he moved to Mantova.

On 29 June 2021, he signed with Feralpisalò.

Career statistics

Club

References

External links 
 International caps at FIGC.it 
 

1996 births
Living people
People from Sesto San Giovanni
Footballers from Lombardy
Italian footballers
Association football forwards
Serie A players
Serie C players
A.C. Milan players
Benevento Calcio players
Rimini F.C. 1912 players
A.C. Prato players
L.R. Vicenza players
Piacenza Calcio 1919 players
Catania S.S.D. players
Mantova 1911 players
FeralpiSalò players
Italy youth international footballers
Sportspeople from the Metropolitan City of Milan